Grimsby Town Football Club entered the 2009–10 as a member of Football League Two for the 6th season on the trot. The club are still aiming to leave Blundell Park within the next few seasons. Manager Mike Newell brought in eight players in the close season, four of which were on loan at the club the previous season, he also released eight players, the club also offered four contracts to youth team members. Manager Mike Newell also gave new contracts to midfielders Jamie Clarke and Danny Boshell. Also in the close season Assistant Manager, Stuart Watkiss did not have his contract renewed and he joined Hull City as Development Coach, and Brian Stein who was chief scout took on the responsibilities of Stuart Watkiss.

Fixtures and results

Pre season matches

South West Challenge Cup

Lincolnshire Cup

Friendlies

Mike Newell took Grimsby Town to the 2009 South West Challenge Cup in Devon, in which the rules allowed him to make ten changes in each match, which he did on each occasion. They started off strong in pre-season with a one-nil win against Belgian side R.R.F.C. Montegnée, with a late free kick from Jamie Clarke. They then played in a five-goal thriller against Yeovil Town in which Grimsby Town won 3–2, with Barry Conlon, Danny North, Nathan Arnold all scoring, going on to reach the semi-final and finishing top of their group. Then continuing their strong form they beat Rushden & Diamonds 4–1 with Adrian Forbes, Jean-Louis Akpa Akpro, Nathan Arnold, Danny North all scoring, putting them into the final. After reaching the Final they had to withdraw on the grounds that they could not agree a kick-off time with their opponents Luton Town, in which there would be police at the ground, providing protection for the fans, as fans' safety concerns had been expressed earlier in the tournament. During the 2009 South West Challenge Cup Mike Newell named two trialists in his 23-man squad, who were Nathan Arnold from Mansfield Town in which he impressed by scoring two goals and he also named Swansea City striker  Chris Jones in his squad, although he didn't score, he impressed enough to be offered a contract. Also joining for their last match, defender Sol Davis from Luton Town joined up for a trial.

On their return home they faced Scunthorpe United in the Lincolnshire Senior Cup Semi-Final, in which they were beaten by a strong Scunthorpe United side 3–0, after Mike Newell fielded a weakened team. Their next opponents were Leeds United, in which they drew 1–1 in front of a big crowd after Jean-Louis Akpa Akpro had put them in the lead in the first half.

They faced Stockport County in their next pre-season match and were beaten one-nil, they were without skipper Ryan Bennett, Rob Atkinson and Danny North, in a well worked play eight minutes into the second half, Poole slotted the ball under Grimsby's Nick Colgan. Both Nick Hegarty and Nathan Jarman had good chances to score but were denied by Stockport County's defence. In the second half of the match Stockport County's Matty Mainwaring went off with two fractures to his leg after a tackle from Michael Leary, new striker Chris Jones, came on for Nick Hegarty.

In their last pre-season friendly Grimsby played Northern Counties East Premier League side Winterton Rangers, the Mariners were the dominant force throughout the game with Barry Conlon grabbing a first half hat-trick in under twenty-five minutes after his first goal after eight minutes and completed his hat-trick twenty five minutes later, with a Nathan Jarman goal after his second. Winterton Rangers scored through Gary Jones after he spotted Leigh Overton off his line and chipping it into the back of the net. Nathan Jarman coming off in the first half with a suspected broken toe, which was later confirmed along with a broken metatarsal. In the second half the manager changing his squad totally with the exception of the keeper and Chris Jones, who came on for the injured Nathan Jarman, in the second half Akpa Akpro scoring four after he walked through the defence, Danny North scored a brace after chipping the keeper twice and nearly grabbing his hat-trick only for his effort to be tipped onto the bar but he later set up Michael Leary for a tap in. Clarke scored his second free kick. Grimsby had left sided Watford player Louis Lavers on trial who started in the first half in left back but moved to the left side of midfield in the second half, on the 75th minute Grimsby brought on 14-year-old Jack Barlow from the youth-team.

Football League Two

FA Cup

League Cup

Football League Trophy

Grimsby received a bye into the second round of the competition, in the Northern Section. Due to the new way of determining which teams received byes into the second round of the competition, the teams who received a bye last season, will not receive a bye two seasons in succession, the byes are now determined by recommendation at club meetings.

League table
Notts County's season mostly made the headlines for all the wrong reasons, as they were involved in an abortive high-spending takeover by a consortium who bought in Sven-Göran Eriksson as Director of Football, and got through four managers during the course of the season. However, they managed to shake off their off-field problems and won the title. Bournemouth continued their revival under Eddie Howe and won promotion in the runners-up spot. The last automatic promotion spot was won by Rochdale, who were promoted for the first time since 1969

Dagenham and Redbridge won the play-offs, reaching the 2nd tier of the Football League for the first time in their 18-year history.

Darlington were unable to recover from losing many of their players during their spell in administration at the end of the previous season, and were relegated in bottom place, becoming only the third club (after Halifax Town and Chester City) to be relegated to the Football Conference on two separate occasions. Grimsby suffered the relegation that they only avoided the previous year due to Luton Town's points deduction; their form improved significantly in the final weeks of the season, but they were ultimately undone by a run of nearly five months without a win earlier in the season, and were relegated to the Football Conference after losing on the final day of the season.

Coaching staff

Appearances and goals

|}

Loaned out player stats

|}

Scorers

All

League

Domestic Cups

Transfers

In

Pre-season

Mid Season

Out

Pre-season

Mid Season

Trialists

Manager Mike Newell took two of the trialists Nathan Arnold, Chris Jones in his 23-man squad to the 2009 South West Challenge Cup and defender Sol Davis joined up with the squad mini way through the 2009 South West Challenge Cup and was given 45 minutes to impress. Before the 2009 South West Challenge Cup Mike Newell had a number of strikers on trial, but none of them were offered a contract. Although not scoring Chris Jones impressed enough to be offered a contract by the club and which was later accepted.

Pre-season

Mid-Season

References 

Grimsby Town
Grimsby Town F.C. seasons